Li Yan (born September 17, 1992) is a former professional snooker player from the People's Republic of China.

Career

Early career
Li received a wild card for the 2008 Shanghai Masters, losing 1–5 to Anthony Hamilton. At the 2009 Shanghai Masters, he defeated Gerard Greene 5–4, before losing to Ryan Day in the last 32.

2011/2012 season
Li qualified for the 2011/2012 professional Main Tour as one of four semi-finalists from the second Q School event. As a new player on the tour Li would need to win four matches in order to reach the main stage of the ranking tournaments. He accomplished this in qualifying for the second biggest tournament on the snooker calendar, the UK Championship, with wins over Stuart Carrington, Andy Hicks, Jack Lisowski and Fergal O'Brien. He faced former world champion Shaun Murphy in the first round of the event and was beaten 3–6. He could not qualify for another tournament for the remainder of the season but did play in all 12 of the PTC events throughout the season reaching, but not progressing past, the last 16 on three occasions.

Li finished the season ranked world number 67, just outside the top 64 who retain their places on the tour. However, due to being ranked 43rd on the PTC Order of Merit he secured one of the eight spots for the highest non-qualified players to play in the 2012/2013 season.

2012/2013 season
Li only won two matches in ranking event qualifiers in the 2012/2013 season. His best results in the minor-ranking Players Tour Championship events were last 16 losses in the third Asian PTC and the fourth European Tour Event, to Stuart Bingham and Rory McLeod respectively. He lost seven consecutive games after this, before beating Robbie Williams 10–7 in the first round of World Championship Qualifying, but his season was ended when he lost 10–2 to Jimmy Robertson in the following round. Li dropped 17 places in the rankings during the year to finish it at world number 84.

2013/2014 season
The first ranking tournament Li could qualify for in the 2013/2014 season was the Indian Open by beating Peter Lines 4–2. He then edged out Jeff Cundy 4–3 to record his first ever win in the main draw of a ranking event, before being thrashed 4–0 by John Higgins. Li also qualified for the International Championship and World Open during the season, losing to compatriots Liang Wenbo and Ding Junhui in the first round. He won more than one match in an event for the only time this season in the World Championship qualifiers by defeating Elliot Slessor 10–5, Dave Harold 10–3 and Joe Swail 10–8, to be just one win away from reaching The Crucible for the first time, but he was thoroughly outplayed by Xiao Guodong in a 10–1 loss. The result ensured Li would not be among the top 64 in the world rankings who keep their places on the snooker tour as he was ranked number 86 and so he played in Q School in an attempt to earn his place back. Li lost in the last 128 of the first event and the last 32 of the second to confirm his exit from the tour.

2014/2015 season
Li entered the three Asian Tour events during the 2014/2015 season, but was knocked out in the first round of each. He again entered Q School, but could not win a match in either of the events, losing 4–3 to both Daniel Wells and Jamie Clarke.

2015/2016 season
Li only played in the Haining Open and was eliminated 4–1 in the first round by John Higgins.

Performance and rankings timeline

References

External links

1992 births
Living people
Chinese snooker players
21st-century Chinese people